Fontenay-sous-Bois is a commune in the eastern suburbs of Paris, France.

Name
The name Fontenay was recorded in the Middle Ages as Fontanetum, meaning "the springs", from Medieval Latin fontana ("natural spring").

The commune was known alternatively as Fontenay-les-Bois (meaning "Fontenay by the woods"), Fontenay-sur-le-Bois (meaning "Fontenay over the wood"), or Fontenay-sous-Bois (meaning "Fontenay under wood"), but eventually in the early 19th century the latter name of Fontenay-sous-Bois became the only name. The wood referred to in the name of the commune is the Bois de Vincennes.

History
In 1929, the commune of Fontenay-sous-Bois lost more than a third of its territory when the city of Paris annexed the Bois de Vincennes, a large part of which belonged to Fontenay-sous-Bois.

Fountain
The Rosettes fountain was lost during World War II. Years later, it was found by chance in a market in the South of France; the town of Fontenay-sous-Bois recovered it, and re-installed it in the place where it can be seen today.

Transport
Fontenay-sous-Bois is served by Fontenay-sous-Bois station on Paris RER line A.

It is also served by Val de Fontenay station, which is an interchange station on Paris RER line A and RER line E.

Education
The commune has eleven preschools, eleven elementary schools, one junior high school, two CES junior high schools, one senior high school/sixth-form college, and one LEP. Collège Victor Duruy and Lycée Pablo Picasso are the main secondary schools.

Demographics

Immigration

Personalities
 Claude Le Péron, bass guitarist
 Noe Pamarot, footballer
 Blaise Matuidi, footballer
 Georges Jouve, ceramist
 Natasha Nice, Porn Star
 Gambi, rapper
 Stanislav Tyshchenko, prominent steel construction engineer 
 Jean-François Voguet, mayor from 2001 to 2014, ordered the expulsion of people living in a house belonging to the city. The mayor is now part of the few PCF mayors who practice the expulsion of squatters.

Interesting facts 
In 2015 a street in Brovary, Ukraine was named after its sister city Fontenay-sous-Bois.

Views

See also
Communes of the Val-de-Marne department

References

External links

 Official website

Communes of Val-de-Marne